Uhlan winning the Auckland Cup at Ellerslie Racecourse was an 1898 New Zealand sports documentary film.

W. H. Bartlett was employed by Alfred Henry Whitehouse to film the Auckland Cup at Ellerslie Racecourse on Boxing Day 1898, the race being won by Uhlan.

Synopsis
The field of horses galloping up the strait and past the judge's box. Ulan being led up and weighed in. The crowd on the grandstand. Ulan's excited owner being restrained from  rushing onto the course.

References

1890s New Zealand films
1898 films
1898 in New Zealand
1890s short documentary films
Black-and-white documentary films
Films set in New Zealand
Lost New Zealand films
New Zealand short documentary films
New Zealand silent short films